In enzymology, a beta-nitroacrylate reductase is an enzyme that catalyzes the chemical reaction

3-nitropropanoate + NADP+  3-nitroacrylate + NADPH + H+

Thus, the two substrates of this enzyme are 3-nitropropanoate and NADP+, whereas its 3 products are 3-nitroacrylate, NADPH, and H+.

This enzyme belongs to the family of oxidoreductases, specifically those acting on the CH-CH group of donor with NAD+ or NADP+ as acceptor.  The systematic name of this enzyme class is 3-nitropropanoate:NADP+ oxidoreductase.

References

 

EC 1.3.1
NADPH-dependent enzymes
Enzymes of unknown structure